Les Planches-près-Arbois (literally Les Planches near Arbois) is a commune in the Jura department in Bourgogne-Franche-Comté in eastern France.

Population

Geography 
The village is located in the Reculée des Planches, a gorge which is home to a series of impressive caves and ends in abrupt, limestone cliffs and scree slopes, making it one of the Jura's most prized natural sites. The whole of the gorge is a protected, natural area and also a Natura 2000 site.

The landscapes and the viewpoints are protected. This protection strictly limits any expansion of the village but seems to correspond to the current inhabitants' desire to treasure their shared heritage.

See also
Communes of the Jura department

References

Communes of Jura (department)